Christy Udoh is a Nigerian sprinter. At the 2012 Summer Olympics, she competed in the Women's 200 metres.

References

External links
 DailyTexanOnline.com/person/christy-udoh
 Olympic Games - day 10 - Athletics

Nigerian female sprinters
Living people
Olympic athletes of Nigeria
Athletes (track and field) at the 2012 Summer Olympics
Year of birth missing (living people)
Olympic female sprinters
21st-century Nigerian women